Jowhor Ile is a Nigerian writer known for his first novel, And After Many Days. In 2016, the novel was awarded the Etisalat Prize for Literature.

Ile's short fiction has appeared in McSweeney's Quarterly and Litro Magazine. He earned his MFA at Boston University, and currently splits his time between Nigeria and the U.S.

References 

21st-century Nigerian novelists
Nigerian male novelists
Living people
Year of birth missing (living people)
Boston University alumni